Luca Lipani (born 18 May 2005) is an Italian professional footballer who plays as a midfielder for  club Genoa.

Club career 

Born in Genoa, Lipani joined the eponymous team's youth sector in 2013, aged eight. Having come through the club's youth ranks, he started playing for the under-19 squad during the 2021–22 season.

Since the start of 2022–23 season, the midfielder started training with the first team, under head coach Alexander Blessin, before being regularly included in senior match-day squads by new manager Alberto Gilardino. In December 2022, he renewed his professional contract with Genoa, with the length remaining undisclosed.

On 25 February 2023, Lipani made his professional debut, coming on as a substitute for Milan Badelj at the 85th minute of a Serie B match against SPAL: in the same occasion, he served an assist for Eddie Salcedo, whose goal settled up the game's final score for a 3–0 win.

International career 

Lipani has represented Italy at various youth international levels, having played for the under-15, under-17, under-18 and under-19 national teams. He also wore the captain armband for the under-17 national team.

In May 2022, he was included in the Italian squad that took part in the UEFA European Under-17 Championship in Israel: during the tournament, he scored a goal, as the Azzurrini were eventually eliminated by the Netherlands (2–1) in the quarter-finals.

In December of the same year, he took part in a training camp with the staff of the Italian senior national team, under manager Roberto Mancini.

Style of play 

Lipani is a right-footed holding midfielder, who excels in winning the ball during the defensive phase, as well as creating chances for his team-mates, thanks to his technical skills. Despite mainly playing in a defensive role, he has also been regarded for his goal contributions, thanks to his shooting abilities.

He has cited Milan Badelj as a source of inspiration.

Career statistics

References

External links 

 
 

2005 births
Living people
People from Genoa
Sportspeople from Genoa
Italian footballers
Italy youth international footballers
Association football midfielders
Serie B players
Genoa C.F.C. players